The Monastery of Ennisnag ( and  meaning "the Island or Islet of the Crane or Heron") was an early Irish Christian monastery, and later a medieval prebendal church, located at Ennisnag, in County Kilkenny, Ireland. The medieval monastery and church are no longer extant. From the ruins, St Peter's church, of Protestant denomination, was established in the early 19th century.

Monastery of Inis-Snaig
Little is known about the monastic community here. Canon William Carrigan suggested "an ancient Church stood on the site from time immemorial to after the Cromwellian era". John O'Hanlon reported that Diocese of Ossory ecclesiastical records names Saint Manchan as patron saint writing "at Inisnag, diocese of Ossory, St. Manchan, whose feast occurs on the 14th of February, was venerated as a patron (Statuta Dioecesis Ossoriensis)". This implies the church was founded in the fifth, or early sixth century. The monastery of Inis-Snaig was probably small in scale.

Modern tradition names Máedóc of Ferns as patron saint of Ennisnag though the claim "his feast day was celebrated here on the 14th of February" suggests confusion regarding patron Saints. Nevertheless, his holy well called "Tobermogue" is preserved.

The Annals of the Four Masters has an entry for AD745, recalling the "battle of Inis Snaig", between "Anmchaidh mac Cucearca", king of Osraighe, and an unknown opponent, and an entry for AD 889, "the death of "Suadhbhar mac Coitceadhach, of Inis Snaig, died an anchorite", confirming the early Christian Irish monastery of Inis Snaig flourished in at least the ninth century, but probably from the early Middle Ages to sometime before, or after, the Norman invasion of the 12th century.

Prebend of Inisnag

The church of Inisnag was recorded as prebendal of Ossory diocese, in the Taxatio Ecclesiastica of AD 1291–1292. The Treasurer of the Diocesan Chapter of Ossory, possessed the prebend of Ennisnag from the 15th century. This Diocesan Chapter, consisted of a Dean, Archdeacon, Chancellor, precentor and Treasurer, is traceable back to Felix O'Dulaney (1178–1202), the late 12th century onwards.  The prebendal church of Ennisnag is included in the list of churches, or parishes, possessed by ecclesiastics of the Diocesan Chapter of Ossory, right down to the Protestant Reformation of the 16th century. According to a papal document titled "Ecllesia De Inisnage Prebend -£ ix.", preserved by the Protestant Bishop of Ossory, with Rev. James Graves once holding a correct transcript of same, the prebend of Inisnag was granted on "the authority of Pope Nicholas IV, 1291 [liber ruber Ossoriensis]".

The medieval church fell into ruins after the Dissolution of the Monasteries, and upheavals of 17th century Ireland.

Abbots and prebendaries

It is impossible to fully catalogue the succession of Abbots, and prebendaries. Nonetheless, the information below is preserved, or inferred.

Floruit abbreviations used for dates:

 aft. = after
 bef. = before

 d. = died in office, or in commendam
 res. = resigned or forfeited office

St Peter's Church

In the 19th century, a Protestant church was constructed on this old church site, named St. Peter's Church. Probably the most distinguished rector and resident of Ennisnag was the famous Irish Antiquarian James Graves, who died in 1886.

See also

 List of abbeys and priories in Ireland (County Kilkenny)

Notes and references

Notes

Citations

Primary sources

Secondary sources

External links

Christian monasteries in the Republic of Ireland
Religion in County Kilkenny
Archaeological sites in County Kilkenny
Augustinian monasteries in the Republic of Ireland
Monasteries dissolved under the Irish Reformation
Medieval Ireland